A thoracostomy is a small incision of the chest wall, with maintenance of the opening for drainage. It is most commonly used for the treatment of a pneumothorax. This is performed by physicians, paramedics, and nurses usually via needle thoracostomy or an incision into the chest wall with the insertion of a thoracostomy tube (chest tube) or with a hemostat and the provider's finger (finger thorocostomy),

A thoracostomy is often confused with thoracotomy, which is a larger incision commonly used to gain access to organs within the chest.

Medical uses 
When air, blood, or other fluids accumulate in the pleural cavity it may be drained by thoracostomy. Whereas air in this space (pneumothorax) may be released by needle thoracostomy, other substances require drainage with a thoracostomy tube.

Contra-indications 
There are no absolute contraindications to thoracostomy. There are relative contraindications (such as coagulopathies); however, in an emergency setting these are outweighed by the necessity to re-inflate a collapsed lung by draining fluid/air from the space around the lung.

Technique 
A primary skin incision is made superiorly to the rib to avoid the neurovascular supply that runs inferiorly to the rib. The surgeon will tunnel through the subcutaneous tissue and muscle to penetrate the pleural cavity. This cavity is where a hemothorax or pneumothorax would accumulate. Confirmation of being in the pleural cavity is done and the chest tube is placed. The chest tube is then connected to a Pleur-evac for continuous drainage. A Roman sandal tie and U-Stitch are done to secure the chest tube and to ensure that removal of the tube will not produce another pneumothorax. Chest x-ray is performed post-procedure to confirm placement and to check for resolution of the pneumothorax/hemothorax.

Chest tubes are designed to collect this drainage and prevent anything from leaking back into the pleural space. This is accomplished by a check valve, usually part of a specialized drainage system with an underwater seal. Depending on the amount of air/fluid to be drained, the collection bottle may need to be periodically changed.

Risks/complications 
Rare complications are mostly due to placement technique, inexperience of the interventionist, and emergent vs. elective circumstances. The most common complications are recurrent pneumothorax (incomplete recovery, but an expected course), infection, and organ injury (due to mechanical damage).

Esophageal injury is rare. If saliva and chyme contents drain from the chest tube, that should raise suspicion of esophageal injury. The main treatment of esophageal injury is surgical repair. The stomach is also rarely injured. Proper technique and not using a trocar during the procedure decreases the risk of this from occurring.

See also 
 Thoracotomy
 Thoracostomy tube

References 

Emergency medical procedures
Pulmonology